The Women's Combined in the 2019 FIS Alpine Skiing World Cup involved only 1 event.  Only two had been scheduled, but the first was cancelled due to unseasonably warm weather. 

The one race was won by Federica Brignone of Italy, who not only won at Crans Montana for the third straight year but also won the season championship (although not a crystal globe due to only having one race in the discipline). At this time, combined races were not included in the season finals, which were held in 2019 in Soldeu, Andorra.

The season was interrupted by the 2019 World Ski Championships, which were held from 4–17 February in Åre, Sweden. The women's combined was held on 8 February.

Standings

DNF1 = Did Not Finish run 1
DNF2 = Did Not Finish run 2
DNS = Did Not Start

See also
 2019 Alpine Skiing World Cup – Women's summary rankings
 2019 Alpine Skiing World Cup – Women's Overall
 2019 Alpine Skiing World Cup – Women's Downhill
 2019 Alpine Skiing World Cup – Women's Super-G
 2019 Alpine Skiing World Cup – Women's Giant Slalom
 2019 Alpine Skiing World Cup – Women's Slalom

References

External links
 

Women's Combined
FIS Alpine Ski World Cup women's combined discipline titles